Alexey Vasilyevich Sarana (born 26 January 2000) is a Russian chess grandmaster.

Chess career
Born in 2000, Sarana earned his international master title in 2016 and his grandmaster title in 2017. In February 2018, he participated in the Aeroflot Open. He finished forty-ninth out of ninety-two, scoring 4½/9 (+1–1=7). In March 2018, he competed in the European Individual Chess Championship. He placed twenty-second, scoring 7½/11 (+4–0=7). In July 2019, Sarana won the Russian Championship Higher League with a score of 6½/9 (+4–0=5), qualifying for the Superfinals of 71st Russian men's Chess championship. In the Superfinal, he finished 9th with a score of 5/11(+1-2=8).

In 2019, Sarana shared first place with Alexandr Predke in the Russian Championship Higher League (second on tiebreak) with a score of 6½/9 (+4–0=5). With this result he qualified for the Superfinals of the Russian men's Chess championship for the second year in a row.

Notes

References

External links
 
 
 

2000 births
Living people
Russian chess players
Chess grandmasters
Sportspeople from Moscow